Kimberly Wilkerson is a beauty pageant contestant from Gillette, Wyoming, USA who has competed in the Miss America contest.

Biography
Wilkerson first competed in the Miss Wyoming 1999 pageant, where she placed first runner-up. The following year, she won the Miss Wyoming 2000 title and went on to represent Wyoming in the Miss America 2001 pageant. She did not place in the pageant, which was won by Angela Perez Baraquio of Hawaii.

Wilkerson is a graduate of Campbell County High School and the University of Wyoming, where she earned a bachelor's degree in agricultural communications and a master's degree in speech-language pathology.

References

External links

Living people
Beauty pageant contestants from Wyoming
Miss America 2001 delegates
People from Gillette, Wyoming
University of Wyoming alumni
Year of birth missing (living people)